Polydrusus formosus the green immigrant leaf weevil, is a species of broad-nosed weevil belonging to the family Curculionidae, subfamily Entiminae.

Distribution
This beetle is present in most of Europe and in the Nearctic realm.

Description
The colour of this insect is brilliant metallic green, as the black body is coated in emerald round scales. If the scales wear off the body beneath appears dark. Antennae are pale with a dark club. These beetles show a short groove between the eyes and evident striae on the elytra.

Biology

Adults can mostly be encountered from April through August. These beetles lay their eggs in the bark or leaves of the host-plants. In Autumn their development is complete. They overwinter and pupate in Spring.

The adults are eaters of young leaves and open blossoms of a wide variety of woodland trees and shrubs (Corylus avellana, Quercus species, etc.), but also fruit trees (apple, pear, cherry, etc.) They are considered a pest of fruit trees, causing extensive damages to their buds, blossoms and shoots.

Bibliography
 Helden, A. 2005, Polydrusus (Chrysophis) formosus (Mayer, 1779) (Coleoptera: Curculionidae): a weevil new to Ireland, Irish Naturalists' Journal, 28
 A. G. Duff (2008). "Checklist of Beetles of the British Isles" (PDF). The Coleopterist. https://web.archive.org/web/20110705155707/http://www.coleopterist.org.uk/checklist2008%20A5.pdf. Retrieved August 13, 2010
 David V. Alford – Pests of fruit crops – Academic Press

References

External links
 Bug Guide

Entiminae
Beetles of Europe
Beetles described in 1779